The Ta' Qali Crafts Village is a tourist attraction in Ta' Qali, Malta. Cultural and traditional artefacts are made and sold within the village. As of 2019, refurbishments have taken place that have led to the upgrading of the premises from the nissen huts used in the British Airfield that was built near the village to larger traditional Maltese buildings. The renovations came in at around 13 million euros. The crafts village is also the location of the annual festa lwien.

References 

Maltese culture
Ta' Qali